Blaise Kouma (born 31 December 1988 in Lomé) is a footballer from the Togolese Republic. He currently plays for Étoile Filante de Lomé.

Career
Kouma began his career with Étoile Filante and was promoted in 2004 to the Togolese Championnat National team.

Position
He played as defensive midfielder or as a central defender.

International career
The defensive midfielder presented the Togo national football team in the U-17, was the captain of the U-20 and under 23. In November 2008 played at the West African International Tournament and captained the Togo team, he selected his country at African Nation Cup for Local African player to be played in Côte d'Ivoire in February 2009.

Honours
 2004-2005 Vice champions of Togo with Étoile Filante
 2004-2006 Vice champion of Togo with Étoile Filante
 2006-2007 Third place in Togo championship
 2008 West African International Tournament
 2009 African Nation Cup for Local African

References

External links

1988 births
Living people
Togolese footballers
Togo international footballers
Étoile Filante du Togo players
Association football defenders
21st-century Togolese people